Valjean is an unincorporated community in Chaplin Rural Municipality No. 164, Saskatchewan, Canada. The community is located between the villages of Chaplin and Mortlach on Highway 1, about 8 km east of the town of Chaplin. There currently is a population of 2 residents living in Valjean as of 2011.

See also

 List of communities in Saskatchewan
 List of ghost towns in Saskatchewan

References

Chaplin No. 164, Saskatchewan
Unincorporated communities in Saskatchewan
Ghost towns in Saskatchewan
Division No. 7, Saskatchewan